Bánh bao (literally "dumplings") is a Vietnamese bun based on the Cantonese da bao (大包, literally "big bun") brought to Vietnam by Cantonese immigrants. It is a ball-shaped bun containing pork or chicken meat, onions, eggs, mushrooms and vegetables, in Vietnamese cuisine. It often has Chinese sausage and a portion of a hard-boiled egg inside. Bánh bao are generally larger than baozi, and are filled with savory fillings, the most common being seasoned ground pork and quail egg. A vegetarian version of bánh bao also exists.

See also
 Baozi
 List of buns
 List of steamed foods
 List of stuffed dishes

References

Stuffed dishes
Steamed buns
Vietnamese pork dishes
Vietnamese chicken dishes
Egg dishes
Bánh